Club Plaza Colonia de Deportes, or simply Plaza Colonia, is a Uruguayan professional football club from Colonia del Sacramento, that competes in the Uruguayan Primera Division. Founded in 1917, the club plays its home games at the 3,000 seater Estadio Juan Gaspar Prandi.

History
The club was founded on April 22, 1917 by Alberto Suppici. They played in the Regional league of Colonia until 1999. They gained their affiliation with AUF in 2000. In 2001 they won promotion to the Primera División Uruguaya and in their debut season they finished in 7th place.

In 2003 the club finally fell to the Second Division after a poor campaign. In 2004 the club was promoted back to the first division, but in 2005 they went back down after another poor campaign. In 2006 they did not play the championship because of financial difficulties.

They re-entered official competitions for the 2006–07 season, playing once more in the Uruguayan 2nd Division.

In May 2016 they won the Clausura Championship for the first time after defeating Peñarol 2–1. They became known as the "Leicester City of Uruguay" because of Leicester City's surprising 2015–16 Premier League title. The season before Plaza Colonia had finished 13th out of 16. In the championship playoff, played between the Apertura and Clausura champions to decide who would be the super champion, Peñarol defeated them 3–1 after extra time.

They qualified for their first ever continental competition in the 2016 Copa Sudamericana. Reports say that some players had never even been on a plane before. They lost to Club Blooming on penalties in the first stage.
 	
In 2021, they won the Apertura tournament, their second accolade, and qualified for the Copa Libertadores for the first time in the club's history. On 7 December, they lost the championship playoff on penalties 8–7 after a 1–1 draw at the conclusion of extra time.

Rivalries 
Plaza's city rivals are Juventud Colonia, and department derby is against Deportivo Colonia.

Honours

 Torneo Clausura
Winners (1): 2016 Clausura

 Torneo Apertura
Winners (1): 2021 Apertura

Current squad

References

External links
 

 
Colonia del Sacramento
Football clubs in Uruguay
Association football clubs established in 1917
1917 establishments in Uruguay